A genealogy book or register is used in Asia and Europe to record the family history of ancestors.

Greater China

It is the Chinese tradition to record family members in a book, including every male born in the family, who they are married to, etc. Traditionally, only males' names are recorded in the books. 

During the Cultural Revolution, many of the books were destroyed, because they were considered by the Chinese Communist Party as among the Four Olds to be eschewed. Therefore much valuable cultural history was destroyed forever. In Taiwan, Hong Kong, and areas untouched by the revolution, many Chinese people still kept their genealogy books, some of which are thousands of years old.
According to Guinness World Records, the oldest genealogy book is that of the Confucius family.

India
In India, the Hindu genealogy registers at Haridwar have been a subject of study for many years and have been microfilmed by Genealogical Society of Utah (GSU) USA.
In India, Michael Lobo has been involved in documenting and compiling the history and genealogy of families belonging to the Mangalorean Catholic community since 1993, under a research project entitled "A Genealogical Encyclopaedia of Mangalorean Catholic Families". As of 2009, his work covers over a thousand families and is being continually updated with names and records of new families. Lobo claims  that the Mangalorean Catholic community has the distinction of being the only community in the world to possess its own genealogical encyclopaedia.

Ireland
Genealogy has been a fundamental part of Irish culture since prehistory. Of the many surviving manuscripts, a large number are devoted to genealogy, either for a single family, or many. It was practised in both Gaelic and Anglo-Norman Ireland. A number of the more notable books include:

 Leabhar na nGenealach (The Great Book of Irish Genealogies)
  The Ó Cléirigh Book of Genealogies
 The Book of the Burkes
 Leabhar Adhamh Ó Cianáin
 An Leabhar Muimhneach
 Leabhar Donn

Families who were professional historians included Clan Ó Duibhgeannáin, Ó Cléirigh, Clan MacFhirbhisigh, Ó Maolconaire.

Korea

In Korea the genealogy book is called jokbo or chokbo.  Each family has a jokbo which is passed down through generations, and copies are often printed and distributed among family members as necessary.  The firstborn son of each family (in a form of primogeniture) inherits the original jokbo (as opposed to the copies) and continues the genealogy and family line.  It was often used in pre-modern (i.e., post-Joseon period) Korea as proof of being of the yangban class.

While many clans still maintain a jokbo, its function (which was very important, heavily relied upon, and legally binding before the modern era) is largely relegated to clan record-keeping and other minor (i.e., not legally binding) social roles.

See also
Genealogy
Family tree

References

Family registers